2007 elections to Redditch Borough Council in England were held on 3 May. One third of the council was up for election and the result was that council stayed under no overall control.

After the election, the composition of the council was:
Labour 14
Conservative 11
Liberal Democrat 3
British National Party 1

Election result

Ward results

References
2007 Redditch election result
Ward results
Labour keeps majority

2007
2007 English local elections
2000s in Worcestershire